Histone deacetylase 5 is an enzyme that in humans is encoded by the HDAC5 gene.

Function 

Histones play a critical role in transcriptional regulation, cell cycle progression, and developmental events. Histone acetylation/deacetylation alters chromosome structure and affects transcription factor access to DNA. The protein encoded by this gene belongs to the class II histone deacetylase/acuc/apha family. It possesses histone deacetylase activity and represses transcription when tethered to a promoter. It coimmunoprecipitates only with HDAC3 family member and might form multicomplex proteins. It also interacts with myocyte enhancer factor-2 (MEF2) proteins, resulting in repression of MEF2-dependent genes. This gene is thought to be associated with colon cancer. Two transcript variants encoding different isoforms have been found for this gene.

AMP-activated protein kinase regulation of the glucose transporter GLUT4 occurs by phosphorylation of HDAC5.

HDAC5 is involved in memory consolidation and suggests that development of more selective HDAC inhibitors for the treatment of Alzheimer's disease should avoid targeting HDAC5. Its function can be effectively examined by siRNA knockdown based on an independent validation.

HDAC5 overexpression in urothelial carcinoma cell lines inhibits long-term proliferation but can promote epithelial-to-mesenchymal transition (EMT)

Interactions 

Histone deacetylase 5 has been shown to interact with:

 BCL6, 
 CBX5, 
 GATA1,
 HDAC3, 
 IKZF1, 
 MEF2A, 
 NRIP1, 
 NCOR1, 
 NCOR2, 
 YWHAQ, and
 ZBTB16.

See also 
 Histone deacetylase

References

Further reading

External links 
 

EC 3.5.1